The Advance was a diesel powered wooden carvel schooner built in 1903 at Kaipara, that was wrecked at Wreck Bay, New South Wales in 1915.

Further reading
Wrecks on the New South Wales Coast. By Loney, J. K. (Jack Kenneth), 1925–1995 Oceans Enterprises. 1993 .
Australian Shipwrecks - vol1 1622-1850, Charles Bateson, AH and AW Reed, Sydney, 1972, Call number 910.4530994 BAT
Australian shipwrecks Vol. 2 1851–1871 By Loney, J. K. (Jack Kenneth), 1925–1995. Sydney. Reed, 1980 910.4530994 LON
Australian shipwrecks Vol. 3 1871–1900 By Loney, J. K. (Jack Kenneth), 1925–1995. Geelong Vic: List Publishing, 1982 910.4530994 LON
Australian shipwrecks Vol. 4 1901–1986 By Loney, J. K. (Jack Kenneth),  1925–1995. Portarlington Vic. Marine History Publications, 1987 910.4530994 LON
Australian shipwrecks Vol. 5 Update 1986 By Loney, J. K. (Jack Kenneth),  1925–1995. Portarlington Vic. Marine History Publications, 1991 910.4530994 LON

References

 Australian National Shipwreck Database
 Australian Shipping - Arrivals and Departures 1788-1968 including shipwrecks
 Encyclopedia of Australian Shipwrecks - New South Wales Shipwrecks

Shipwrecks of the Shoalhaven Region
Ships built in New Zealand
1903 ships
Maritime incidents in 1915
1901 – World War I ships of Australia
Merchant ships of Australia
Schooners of Australia